This is a chronological list of New Zealand Test wicket-keepers.

References
 New Zealand wicket-keepers

Wicket-keepers, Test
New Zealand
New Zealand, Test
Wicket-keepers